Kapus may be:
 the plural of kapu
 a surname; notable people include:
 Krisztián Kapus
 Franz Kapus
 Richard Kapuš

See also 
 Kappus